Three vessels of the Royal Navy have borne the name HMS Mignonne, which means "dainty" in French.
Mignonne was captured by the British in 1794 in the harbour of Calvi, used briefly and then burnt in 1797 as useless.
Mignonne was a French navy corvette that the British captured in 1803 and disposed of in 1804 after she grounded at Jamaica.
 was the French navy brig Phaeton, which  captured in 1806. She was renamed Musette in 1807 and was sold in 1814.

See also

Note

Source
 

Royal Navy ship names